Diego Ferreira may refer to:

 Diego Ferreira (athlete) (born 1975), Paraguayan athlete
 Carlos Diego Ferreira (born 1985), Brazilian mixed martial artist
 Diego Ferreira (footballer, born 1985), Uruguayan football midfielder
 Diego Ferreira (footballer, born 1996), Brazilian football right-back